The Zeiss Touit 2.8/12 is an interchangeable APS-C wide-angle camera lens announced by Zeiss on September 18, 2012. Zeiss used a diagnostic optical design for this lens.

Build quality
The lens features a minimalist matte-black plastic exterior with a Zeiss badge on the side of the barrel and a rubber focus ring.

It is robust and very compact considering its ultra wide-angle focal length.

Optical quality 
The lens is sharp in the center from wide open apertures, but needs stepping down to 5.6 for corners to catch up.

Chromatic aberrations are well controlled and barrel distortion is visible when not corrected but typical for this kind of wide-angle lens. Also vignetting is visible wide open but is diminished when stepping down. 

Resistance to flare is average, with sun stars being produced at f/11.

See also
 List of third-party E-mount lenses
 Fujifilm X-mount Lenses

References

http://www.dpreview.com/products/zeiss/lenses/zeiss_touit_12_2p8/specifications

Camera lenses introduced in 2012
Touit 2.8 12
X-mount lenses